Gulmira may refer to:

 Gulmira (name) from Turkish Gül see also Gol Mir
 Ho Yinsen, a resident of Gulmira and a fictional Iron Man character.

ru:Гульмира